The 1990 Andalusian regional election was held on Saturday, 23 June 1990, to elect the 3rd Parliament of the autonomous community of Andalusia. All 109 seats in the Parliament were up for election.

The candidate for the PSOE, Manuel Chaves, was invested as President of the Regional Government of Andalusia for the first time, after winning the election with an absolute majority of seats. He would remain in the presidency of this autonomous community for the longest period of time than any of his predecessors, not stepping down from office until 2009.

Overview

Electoral system
The Parliament of Andalusia was the devolved, unicameral legislature of the autonomous community of Andalusia, having legislative power in regional matters as defined by the Spanish Constitution of 1978 and the regional Statute of Autonomy, as well as the ability to vote confidence in or withdraw it from a regional president.

Voting for the Parliament was on the basis of universal suffrage, which comprised all nationals over 18 years of age, registered in Andalusia and in full enjoyment of their political rights. The 109 members of the Parliament of Andalusia were elected using the D'Hondt method and a closed list proportional representation, with an electoral threshold of three percent of valid votes—which included blank ballots—being applied in each constituency. Seats were allocated to constituencies, corresponding to the provinces of Almería, Cádiz, Córdoba, Granada, Huelva, Jaén, Málaga and Seville, with each being allocated an initial minimum of eight seats and the remaining 45 being distributed in proportion to their populations (provided that the number of seats in each province did not exceed two times that of any other).

The use of the D'Hondt method might result in a higher effective threshold, depending on the district magnitude.

Election date
The term of the Parliament of Andalusia expired four years after the date of its previous election. Election day was to take place between the thirtieth and the sixtieth day from the date of expiry of parliament barring any date within from 1 July to 31 August. The previous election was held on 22 June 1986, which meant that the legislature's term would have expired on 22 June 1990. The election was required to take place no later than the sixtieth day from the date of expiry of parliament on the condition that it was not held between 1 July and 31 August, setting the latest possible election date for the Parliament on Saturday, 30 June 1990.

The Parliament of Andalusia could not be dissolved before the date of expiry of parliament. In the event of an investiture process failing to elect a regional president within a two-month period from the first ballot, the candidate from the party with the highest number of seats was to be deemed automatically elected.

Parliamentary composition
The Parliament of Andalusia was officially dissolved on 30 April 1990, after the publication of the dissolution decree in the Official Gazette of the Regional Government of Andalusia. The table below shows the composition of the parliamentary groups in the Parliament at the time of dissolution.

Parties and candidates
The electoral law allowed for parties and federations registered in the interior ministry, coalitions and groupings of electors to present lists of candidates. Parties and federations intending to form a coalition ahead of an election were required to inform the relevant Electoral Commission within ten days of the election call, whereas groupings of electors needed to secure the signature of at least one percent of the electorate in the constituencies for which they sought election, disallowing electors from signing for more than one list of candidates.

Below is a list of the main parties and electoral alliances which contested the election:

Opinion polls
The table below lists voting intention estimates in reverse chronological order, showing the most recent first and using the dates when the survey fieldwork was done, as opposed to the date of publication. Where the fieldwork dates are unknown, the date of publication is given instead. The highest percentage figure in each polling survey is displayed with its background shaded in the leading party's colour. If a tie ensues, this is applied to the figures with the highest percentages. The "Lead" column on the right shows the percentage-point difference between the parties with the highest percentages in a poll. When available, seat projections determined by the polling organisations are displayed below (or in place of) the percentages in a smaller font; 55 seats were required for an absolute majority in the Parliament of Andalusia.

Results

Overall

Distribution by constituency

Aftermath

Notes

References
Opinion poll sources

Other

1990 in Andalusia
Andalusia
Regional elections in Andalusia
June 1990 events in Europe